The Léonie Sonning Music Prize, or Sonning Award, which is recognized as Denmark's highest musical honor, is given annually to an international composer or musician. It was first awarded in 1959 to composer Igor Stravinsky. Laureates are now selected by the directors of The Léonie Sonning Music Foundation, which was founded in 1965.

The diploma is in Danish, and the prize includes EUR 133,000 (US$ 146,400) and a monotype by the Danish painter Maja Lisa Engelhardt. Honorees are treated to a concert, typically held in Copenhagen, and are often invited to teach a master class of Danish musicians.

The award is not directly related to the Sonning Prize, which is the Danish award presented by a foundation in memory of Sonning's late husband, .

Laureates

References

External links 
 

International music awards
Danish music awards
Awards established in 1959
1959 establishments in Denmark